The Sir James George Frazer Memorial Lectureship in Social Anthropology is a British academic lecture series.

In 1920 a sum of £675 was raised by a Committee of the University of Cambridge for the purpose of commemorating Sir James Frazer's contributions to learning. In accordance with the wishes of the subscribers, a Frazer Lectureship in Anthropology was founded, the annual income of the fund being assigned to the University of Oxford, University of Cambridge, University of Glasgow and University of Liverpool in rotation for this purpose.

Lectures

Oxford Lectures

Cambridge Lectures

Glasgow Lectures

Liverpool Lectures

References
Oxford University Gazette
Cambridge University Reporter
University of Liverpool Recorder
Medals, Awards, and Memorial Lecture Series in Anthropology. Yearbook of Anthropology. (1955), pp. 753–763.
Dawson, Warren Royal. 1932. The Frazer lectures, 1922–1932, by divers hands. London: Macmillan and Co., Limited.

Notes

Anthropology
British lecture series
Lecture series at the University of Oxford
Lecture series at the University of Cambridge